The 1983 San Marino motorcycle Grand Prix was the final race of the 1983 Grand Prix motorcycle racing season. It took place on 2–4 September 1983 at the Autodromo Dino Ferrari.

Classification

500 cc

References

San Marino and Rimini Riviera motorcycle Grand Prix
San Marino
San Marino Motorcycle Grand Prix
San Marino Motorcycle Grand Prix